Christopher Murray Grieve (11 August 1892 – 9 September 1978), best known by his pen name Hugh MacDiarmid, was a Scottish poet, journalist, essayist and political figure. He is considered one of the principal forces behind the Scottish Renaissance and has had a lasting impact on Scottish culture and politics. He was a founding member of the National Party of Scotland in 1928 but left in 1933 due to his Marxist–Leninist views. He joined the Communist Party the following year only to be expelled in 1938 for his nationalist sympathies. He would subsequently stand as a parliamentary candidate for both the Scottish National Party (1945) and British Communist Party (1964).

Grieve's earliest work, including Annals of the Five Senses, was written in English, but he is best known for his use of "synthetic Scots", a literary version of the Scots language that he himself developed. From the early 1930s onwards MacDiarmid made greater use of English, sometimes a "synthetic English" that was supplemented by scientific and technical vocabularies.

The son of a postman, MacDiarmid was born in the Scottish border town of Langholm, Dumfriesshire. He was educated at Langholm Academy before becoming a teacher for a brief time at Broughton Higher Grade School in Edinburgh. He began his writing career as a journalist in Wales, contributing to the socialist newspaper The Merthyr Pioneer run by Labour party founder Keir Hardie before joining the Royal Army Medical Corps at the outbreak of the First World War. He served in Salonica, Greece and France before developing cerebral malaria and subsequently returning to Scotland in 1918. MacDiarmid's time in the army was influential in his political and artistic development.

After the war he continued to work as a journalist, living in Montrose where he became editor and reporter of the Montrose Review as well as a justice of the peace and a member of the county council. In 1923 his first book, Annals of the Five Senses, was published at his own expense, followed by Sangschaw in 1925, and Penny Wheep. A Drunk Man Looks at the Thistle, published in 1926, is generally regarded as MacDiarmid's most famous and influential work.

Moving to the Shetland island of Whalsay in 1933 with his son Michael and second wife, Valda Trevlyn, MacDiarmid continued to write essays and poetry despite being cut off from mainland cultural developments for much of the 1930s. He died at his cottage Brownsbank, near Biggar, in 1978 at the age of 86.

Throughout his life MacDiarmid was a supporter of both communism and Scottish nationalism, views that often put him at odds with his contemporaries. He was a founding member of the National Party of Scotland, forerunner to the modern Scottish National Party. He stood as a candidate for the Scottish National Party in 1945 and 1950, and for the Communist Party of Great Britain in 1964. In 1949, MacDiarmid's opinions led George Orwell to include his name in a list of "those who should not be trusted" to MI5. Today, MacDiarmid's work is credited with inspiring a new generation of writers. Fellow poet Edwin Morgan said of him: "Eccentric and often maddening genius he may be, but MacDiarmid has produced many works which, in the only test possible, go on haunting the mind and memory and casting Coleridgean seeds of insight and surprise."

Biography

Early life
Grieve was born in Langholm in 1892. His father was a postman; his family lived above the town library, giving MacDiarmid access to books from an early age. Grieve attended Langholm Academy and, from 1908, Broughton Junior Student Centre in Edinburgh, where he studied under George Ogilvie who introduced him to the magazine The New Age.  He left the school on 27 January 1911, following the theft of some books and postage stamps; his father died eight days later, on 3 February 1911.

Following Grieve's departure from Broughton, Ogilvie arranged for Grieve to be employed as a journalist with the Edinburgh Evening Dispatch. Grieve was to lose this job later in 1911, but on 20 July of that year he had his first article, "The Young Astrology" published in The New Age. In October 1911, Grieve moved to Ebbw Vale in Monmouthshire, Wales where he worked as a newspaper reporter; by 1913 he had returned to Scotland and was working for the Clydebank and Renfrew Press in Clydebank, near Glasgow. It was here that Grieve first encountered the work of John Maclean, Neil Malcolm Maclean, and James Maxton.

First World War
In July 1915 Grieve left the town of Forfar in eastern Scotland and travelled to the Hillsborough barracks in Sheffield. He went on to serve in the Royal Army Medical Corps in Salonica, Greece and France during the First World War. After the war, he married and returned to journalism.

Return to Scotland
MacDiarmid's first book, Annals of the Five Senses, was a mixture of prose and poetry written in English, and was published in 1923 while MacDiarmid was living in Montrose. At about this time MacDiarmid turned to Scots for a series of books, culminating in what is probably his best known work, the book-length A Drunk Man Looks at the Thistle. This poem is widely regarded as one of the most important long poems in 20th-century Scottish literature. After that, he published several books containing poems in both English and Scots.

Time in England
From 1929 to 1930 MacDiarmid lived in London, and worked for Compton Mackenzie's magazine, Vox. MacDiarmid lived in Liverpool from 1930 to 1931, before returning to London; he left again in 1932, and lived in the village of Thakeham in West Sussex until he returned to Scotland in 1932.

Whalsay, Shetland
MacDiarmid lived in Sodom on the island of Whalsay, Shetland, from 1933 until 1942. He often asked the local fishermen to take him out in their boats and once asked them to leave him on an uninhabited island for a night and pick him up again in the morning. Local legend has it that he asked about Whalsay words and some of the Whalsay folk made up fantastical words that did not exist. The dialect is strong on the island and any strange words would have probably sounded quite plausible. "The often tormented genius wrote much of his finest poetry (including 'On a Raised Beach') and, via the Whalsay post office, conducted furious correspondence with the leading writers and thinkers of his generation."
The croft house that was his Whalsay home was made into a camping böd, the Grieves House böd, run by Shetland Amenity Trust. But it is sadly in a state of disrepair and "closed for maintenance" as of 2022.

Return to the Scottish Mainland
In 1942 MacDiarmid was directed to war work and moved to Glasgow, where he lived until 1949. Between 1949 and 1951 he lived in a cottage on the grounds of Dungavel House, Lanarkshire, before moving to his final home: "Brownsbank", a cottage in Candymill, near Biggar in the Scottish Borders. He died, aged 86, in Edinburgh.

Politics

In 1928, MacDiarmid helped found the National Party of Scotland, but was expelled during the 1930s.

MacDiarmid was at times a member of the Communist Party of Great Britain, but he was expelled twice. John Baglow reports that "his comrades never really knew what to make of him." Indeed, he was expelled from the Communist Party for being a Scottish Nationalist, and from the National Party of Scotland for being a Communist. 
As a follower of the Scottish revolutionary socialist John Maclean, he saw no contradiction between international socialism and the nationalist vision of a Scottish workers' republic, but this ensured a fraught relationship with organised political parties.

From 1931, whilst he was in London, until 1943, after he left the Shetland island of Whalsay, MacDiarmid was under surveillance by British military intelligence. In 1949, George Orwell included MacDiarmid in his list for British Intelligence of fellow Leftist writers whom he suspected of sympathies for Joseph Stalin or direct links with the intelligence services of the USSR.

MacDiarmid stood in the Glasgow Kelvingrove constituency in the 1945 and 1950 general elections. He stood against the Conservative Prime Minister Alec Douglas-Home in Kinross and Western Perthshire at the 1964 election, taking only 127 votes.

In 2010 letters were discovered showing that MacDiarmid believed the Nazi invasion of Britain (Operation Sea Lion) would benefit Scotland. In a letter sent from Whalsay, Shetland, in April 1941, he wrote: "On balance I regard the Axis powers, tho' more violently evil for the time being, less dangerous than our own government in the long run and indistinguishable in purpose." A year earlier, in June 1940, he wrote: "Although the Germans are appalling enough, they cannot win, but the British and French bourgeoisie can and they are a far greater enemy. If the Germans win they could not hold their gain for long, but if the French and British win it will be infinitely more difficult to get rid of them".

Marc Horne in the Daily Telegraph commented: "MacDiarmid flirted with fascism in his early thirties, when he believed it was a doctrine of the left. In two articles written in 1923, Plea for a Scottish Fascism and Programme for a Scottish Fascism, he appeared to support Mussolini’s regime. By the 1930s, however, following Mussolini’s lurch to the right, his position had changed and he castigated Neville Chamberlain over his appeasement of Hitler’s expansionism." In response, Deirdre Grieve, MacDiarmid's daughter-in-law and literary executor, noted: "I think he entertained almost every ideal it was possible to entertain at one point or another."

Writing

Much of the work that MacDiarmid published in the 1920s was written in what he termed "Synthetic Scots": a version of the Scots language that "synthesised" multiple local dialects, which MacDiarmid constructed from dictionaries and other sources.

From the 1930s onwards MacDiarmid found himself turning more and more to English as a means of expression so that most of his later poetry is written in that language. His ambition was to live up to Rilke's dictum that 'the poet must know everything' and to write a poetry that contained all knowledge. As a result, many of the poems in Stony Limits (1934) and later volumes are a kind of found poetry reusing text from a range of sources. Just as he had used John Jamieson's dialect dictionary for his poems in 'synthetic Scots', so he used Chambers Twentieth Century Dictionary for poems such as 'On a Raised Beach'. Other poems, including 'On a Raised Beach' and 'Etika Preobrazhennavo Erosa' used extensive passages of prose. This practice, particularly in the poem 'Perfect', led to accusations of plagiarism from supporters of the Welsh poet Glyn Jones, to which MacDiarmid's response was 'The greater the plagiarism the greater the work of art.' The great achievement of this late poetry is to attempt on an epic scale to capture the idea of a world without God in which all the facts the poetry deals with are scientifically verifiable. In his critical work Lives of the Poets, Michael Schmidt notes that Hugh MacDiarmid 'had redrawn the map of Scottish poetry and affected the whole configuration of English literature'.

MacDiarmid wrote a number of non-fiction prose works, including Scottish Eccentrics and his autobiography Lucky Poet. He also did a number of translations from Scottish Gaelic, including Duncan Ban MacIntyre's Praise of Ben Dorain, which were well received by native speakers including Sorley MacLean.

Personal life
He had a daughter, Christine, and a son, Walter, by his first wife Peggy Skinner. He had a son, James Michael Trevlyn, known as Michael, by his second wife Valda Trevlyn (1906-1989); Michael was a conscientious objector to post-World War II National Service and became vice chair of the Scottish National Party.

Places of interest
MacDiarmid grew up in the Scottish town of Langholm in Dumfriesshire. The town is home to a monument in his honour made of cast iron which takes the form of a large open book depicting images from his writings.

MacDiarmid lived in Montrose for a time where he worked for the local newspaper the Montrose Review.

MacDiarmid also lived on the isle of Whalsay in Shetland, in Sodom (Sudheim). The house is now one of Shetland's 'Camping Bods', offering basic, bothy-style accommodation to visitors.

Brownsbank Cottage, near Biggar, South Lanarkshire, the home of MacDiarmid and his wife Valda from 1952 until their deaths, has been restored by the Biggar Museum Trust.

Hugh MacDiarmid is commemorated in Makars' Court, outside the Writers' Museum, Lawnmarket, Edinburgh. Selections for Makars' Court are made by the Writers' Museum, the Saltire Society and the Scottish Poetry Library.

Portrait in National Portrait Gallery primary collection and film portrait 

Hugh MacDiarmid sat for sculptor Alan Thornhill and a bronze was acquired by the National Portrait Gallery. The terracotta original is held in the collection of the artist. The correspondence file relating to the MacDiarmid bust is held in the archive of the Henry Moore Foundation's Henry Moore Institute in Leeds.

Filmmaker and poet Margaret Tait  made a film Hugh MacDiarmid, A Portrait (1964)  when the poet was seventy-one which novelist Ali Smith describes as ‘a model of versatility, a meld of voice and image each illuminating the other’.  The poems heard read by MacDiarmid are ‘You Know Not Who I Am’, ‘Somersault’, ‘Krang’ and some lines from ‘The Kind of Poetry I Want’.  Writing of MacDiarmid and Tait, academic Sarah Neely notes ‘MacDiarmid was also a champion of Tait’s work as a film-maker and poet; he published a few of her poems and also organised a screening of her films at the Dunedin Society’.

References

Bibliography

Poetry

Sangschaw (1925)
Penny Wheep (1926)
A Drunk Man Looks at the Thistle (1926)
The Lucky Bag (1927)
To Circumjack Cencrastus (1930)
First Hymn to Lenin and Other Poems (1931)
Second Hymn to Lenin (1932)
Scots Unbound and Other Poems (1932)
Stony Limits and Other Poems (1934)
The Birlinn of Clanranald (1935)
Second Hymn to Lenin and Other Poems (1935)
Speaking for Scotland: Selected Poems of Hugh MacDiarmid (1946)
Poems of the East-West Synthesis (1946)
A Kist of Whistles (1947)
In Memoriam James Joyce (1955)
Three Hymns to Lenin (1957)
The Battle Continues (1958)
The Kind of Poetry I Want (1961)
Collected Poems (1962)
Poems to Paintings by William Johnstone 1933 (1963)
A Lap of Honour (1967)
Early Lyrics (1968)
A Clyack-Sheaf (1969)
More Collected Poems (1970)
Selected Poems (1971)
The Hugh MacDiarmid Anthology: Poems in Scots and English (1972)
Dìreadh (1974)
The Complete Poems of Hugh MacDiarmid Volume 1 & 2 (1978)

Letters
Bold, Alan. The Letter of Hugh MacDiarmid
Kerrigan, Catherine. The Hugh MacDiarmid-George Ogilvie Letters
Wilson, Susan R. The Correspondence Between Hugh MacDiarmid and Sorley Maclean

Also see:

Manson, John. Dear Grieve: Letters to Hugh MacDiarmid (C. M. Grieve)
 Junor, Beth. Scarcely Ever Out of My Thoughts: The Letters of Valda Trevlyn Grieve to Christopher Murray Grieve (Hugh MacDiarmid)

Anthologies edited by MacDiarmid

The Golden Treasury of Scottish Poetry (1940)

Other

Annals of the Five Senses (1923)
 A Plea for Scottish Fascism (1923)
 A Program for Scottish Fascism (1923)
Contemporary Scottish Studies (1926-)
Scottish Scene (1934) (collaboration with Lewis Grassic Gibbon)
Scottish Eccentrics (1938)
The Islands of Scotland (1939)
Lucky Poet (1943)
The Company I've Kept (1966)
The Uncanny Scot (1968)

Further reading
 Perrie, Walter (1980), Nietzche and the Drunk Man, in Cencrastus No. 2, Spring 1980, pp. 9 – 12, 
 Baglow, John (1987). Hugh MacDiarmid: The Poetry of Self McGill-Queen's Press, 
 Bold, Alan (1983). MacDiarmid: The Terrible Crystal, Routledge & Kegan Paul, 
 Bold, Alan (1988). MacDiarmid A Critical Biography, John Murray, 
 Buthlay, Kenneth (1982), Hugh MacDiarmid (C.M. Grieve), Scottish Academic Press, 
 Glen, Duncan (1964). Hugh Macdiarmid (Christopher Murray Grieve) and the Scottish Renaissance , Chambers, Edinburgh et al., 
 Herbert, W. N. (1992). To Circumjack MacDiarmid: The Poetry and Prose of Hugh MacDiarmid. Oxford: Clarendon, 
 Hubbard, Tom (1992), Hugh MacDiarmid: The Integrative Vision, in Hendry, Joy (ed.), Chapman No. 69-70, Autumn 1992, 
 Lyall, Scott (2006). Hugh MacDiarmid's Poetry and Politics of Place: Imagining a Scottish Republic, Edinburgh University Press, 
 Lyall, Scott and Margery Palmer McCulloch (eds) (2011). The Edinburgh Companion to Hugh MacDiarmid, Edinburgh University Press, 
 Purdie, Bob (2012). Hugh MacDiarmid, Black, Green, Red and Tartan, Welsh Academic Press, 
 Riach, Alan (1991). Hugh MacDiarmid’s Epic Poetry, Edinburgh University Press, 
 Ross, Raymond J. (1983), Hugh MacDiarmid and John MacLean, in Hearn, Sheila G. (ed.), Cencrastus No. 11, New Year 1983, pp. 33 – 36, 
 Wright, Gordon (1977). MacDiarmid: An Illustrated Biography, Gordon Wright Publishing,

External links

Hugh MacDiarmid profile at Carcanet Press
 Hugh MacDiarmid reading his poetry at the Poetry Archive
 Second Hymn to Lenin by Hugh MacDiarmid
HUGH MACDIARMID: A Portrait Film about MacDiarmid at the Scottish Screen Archive, National Library of Scotland
Review of Bob Purdie's book
 Archival material at 
Some notes of MacDiarmid's Gaelic Idea

1892 births
1978 deaths
Communist Party of Great Britain members
Historical linguists
Lallans poets
British modernist poets
British Army personnel of World War I
Royal Army Medical Corps soldiers
Scottish biographers
Scottish communists
Scottish essayists
Scottish journalists
Scottish memoirists
Scottish National Party politicians
Scots Makars
Scottish soldiers
Scottish translators
People from Langholm
Scottish Renaissance
Scottish linguists
Scots-language writers
Translators from Scottish Gaelic
20th-century Scottish poets
Scottish male poets
20th-century British translators
Alumni of the Edinburgh College of Art
20th-century essayists
People associated with Shetland
People from Thakeham
20th-century pseudonymous writers
British Communist poets